Polly of the Storm Country is a lost 1920 American drama film directed by Arthur Rosson and written by Frank Mitchell Dazey. The film stars Mildred Harris, Emory Johnson, Charlotte Burton, Harry Northrup, Ruby Lafayette, and Maurice Valentin. It is based on the 1920 novel Storm Country Polly by Grace Miller White. The film was released on April 4, 1920, by First National Exhibitors' Circuit.

Cast
Mildred Harris as Polly 
Emory Johnson as Robert Robertson
Charlotte Burton as Evelyn Robertson
Harry Northrup as Marcus MacKenzie
Ruby Lafayette as Granny Hope
Maurice Valentin as Jeremiah Hopkins
Charles West as Oscar Bennett
Mickey Moore as Wee Jerry

References

External links

 

1920 films
1920s English-language films
Silent American drama films
1920 drama films
1920 lost films
First National Pictures films
Films directed by Arthur Rosson
American silent feature films
American black-and-white films
Lost American films
Lost drama films
Films based on American novels
Films based on works by Grace Miller White
1920s American films
English-language drama films